The 2009 Presbyterian Blue Hose football team represented Presbyterian College in the 2009 NCAA Division I FCS football season. They were led by first-year head coach Harold Nichols and played their home games at Bailey Memorial Stadium. They were a member of the Big South Conference. They finished the season 0–11, 0–6 in Big South play to finish in last place.

Schedule

Source: Schedule

References

Presbyterian
Presbyterian Blue Hose football seasons
College football winless seasons
Presbyterian Blue Hose football